The Hoffman Agency is a global public relations firm with headquarters in Silicon Valley and offices in Europe, Asia-Pacific and the United States.

History
The Hoffman Agency was founded in the U.S. in December 1987 by Lou Hoffman to provide communications services to technology companies, including Hewlett-Packard.

In 1993 the firm won the Silver Anvil Award for its work launching HP's miniature disk drive, Kittyhawk. In 1994 The Hoffman Agency initiated its first global campaign in launching Hyundai's (now known as Hynix) MPEG-2 chip in Europe and Asia Pacific.

The firm has been operating in Asia for over 20 years, beginning with the opening of its Singapore office in 1996. The company opened additional offices in Asia between 1996 and 2000, including those in Beijing, Hong Kong and Tokyo.

In 2000, the opening of the company's Beijing office made The Hoffman Agency the first Silicon Valley technology PR firm to enter mainland China.

The Hoffman Agency expanded to Europe in 2001 with the opening of an office in London.

Asia expansion continued with an office opening in Korea in 2001. In 2010 the company started an office in Shanghai, and in 2017 and 2018 opened additional offices in Jakarta and Taiwan.

The company has received more than 150 industry awards, including being selected by The Holmes Report as Tech Agency of the Year Finalist in 2014, 2015 and 2016 in the U.S., and Technology Consultancy of the Year in Asia in 2018.

In April 2019, the agency formed an exclusive partnership with global communications firm Hotwire. Under the agreement, Hotwire will collaborate with Hoffman's offices in Singapore, China, Hong Kong, Taiwan, Japan, Korea and Indonesia to provide public relations services to clients.

Notable campaigns
Alcatel-Lucent

Bell Labs is the research and development subsidiary of Alcatel-Lucent founded by Alexander Graham Bell in 1925. The Hoffman Agency created a campaign around the Big Bang Bash, an event honoring the 50th anniversary of the research providing the first tangible evidence of "cosmic microwave background (CMB) radiation" — proving the Big Bang. The event was hosted by Bell Labs, whose researchers played an important role in confirming the scientific theory. The campaign resulted in over 220 million online impressions and was covered in publications such as the Huffington Post, NPR and Scientific American. As a result, The Hoffman Agency won the 2014 Holmes Report In2 SABRE Award in the Most Innovative Print and Digital Media category for this campaign.

City of Fremont

Since 2012, The Hoffman Agency has helped The City of Fremont, CA advance its economic development efforts and brand image. The Hoffman Agency won a 2014 In2 SABRE Award for its work with the City after launching the Think Silicon Valley website as the anchor to its overall communications campaign. The website has helped the City build relationships with local businesses and media, and established itself as a hub for advanced manufacturing, clean tech and life sciences. In addition, The Hoffman Agency has helped extend the City's reach beyond local press through media coverage in The Associated Press, The Washington Post, Bloomberg and CNET. As a result, The Hoffman Agency was shortlisted as a finalist in the 2015 SABRE Awards North America for its continued work with Fremont.

Nautilus

Global fitness products company Nautilus, Inc. aimed to drive sales and bolster the company's brand as a home fitness innovator for the debut of the Bowflex Max Trainer cardio machine. The Hoffman Agency created a launch campaign, which resulted in media coverage from publications including TechCrunch, LA Times, Men's Fitness and USA Today. As a result, the agency submitted the product for recognition and gained two international design awards. To add to the Bowflex brand momentum, Hoffman created and launched the Bowflex Insider blog, which was named the best fitness blog by USAHomeGym and won an award from the Holmes Report as an innovative home media property.

Nokia

In January 2016, Nokia acquired Alcatel-Lucent and began integrating its technology across Nokia's existing portfolios in cloud, SDN and IP networks. The acquisition was finalized in November 2016. Hoffman has helped Alcatel-Lucent transition into new roles within Nokia and supported various business groups related to SDN, IP/optical networking, verticals, software, 5G/IoT and more. On the networking front, The Hoffman Agency has worked with Nokia on announcements such as the Photonic Service Engine 3 chipset launched in March 2018 that was covered by VentureBeat and ZDNet. Additionally, Hoffman coordinated with Nokia to invite media members to the Future X Lab facility in New Jersey in November 2018, resulting in articles by The Wall Street Journal, Network World and Wireless Week, among others.

NXP

Global semiconductor manufacturer NXP Semiconductors engaged The Hoffman Agency to lead media relations surrounding the company's product announcements at CES 2017. The campaign was covered in publications such as CNET, Digital Trends, Fast Company and TechRepublic. Based on the campaign, The Hoffman Agency was chosen as a finalist in the Trade Shows and Awards category at the 2018 North America IN2 SABRE Awards.

Sony

Sony launched its High-Res Audio (HRA) website and product line hoping to reach millennials. The Hoffman Agency created a content marketing campaign that doubled the page views and won the 2017 PR News Agency Elite Awards in both the content marketing and search engine optimization categories.

Synaptics

Synaptics is a company that invents human interface technology. The Hoffman Agency created a campaign for its auto technology that allows vehicle access via fingerprints in both the U.S. and Chinese markets. The campaign resulted in coverage in USA Today and Detroit Free Press, and the Holmes Report shortlisted Hoffman in the Best in B2B Earned Media category for the IN2 SABRE Awards.

Zscaler

The Hoffman Agency helped prepare Zscaler for the first IPO of 2018. The campaign was covered in mainstream, local and security publications such as TechCrunch, Barron's, Financial Times and Business Insider.

References

Further reading

External links
Official website
The Hoffman Agency's Facebook page
The Hoffman Agency's SlideShare page
Daily Brew The Hoffman Agency's Twitter profile
The Hoffman Agency's Pinterest page
The Hoffman Agency's LinkedIn page
The Hoffman Agency's storytelling techniques microsite

Public relations companies of the United States
Companies established in 1987
Companies based in San Jose, California
Multinational companies